The 1954 North Dakota gubernatorial election was held on November 2, 1954. Incumbent Republican Norman Brunsdale defeated Democratic nominee Cornelius Bymers with 64.21% of the vote. , this was the last time Rolette County voted for the Republican candidate.

Primary elections
Primary elections were held on June 29, 1954.

Democratic primary

Candidates
Cornelius Bymers, State Representative

Results

Republican primary

Candidates
Norman Brunsdale, incumbent Governor
Wallace E. Warner, former North Dakota Attorney General

Results

General election

Candidates
Norman Brunsdale, Republican 
Cornelius Bymers, Democratic

Results

References

1954
North Dakota
Gubernatorial